"Paid My Dues" is a song by American recording artist Anastacia from her second studio album Freak of Nature (2001). It was released on November 12, 2001, as the album's lead single. The song was written by Anastacia, Greg Lawson, Damon Sharpe, and LaMenga Kafi and was produced by Ric Wake with additional production by Richie Jones.

"Paid My Dues" became a commercial success, reaching number one in Denmark, Hungary, Italy, Norway, and Switzerland, as well as peaking within the top 10 in several other mainland European countries.

Composition
"Paid My Dues" was written by Anastacia, LaMenga Kafi, Greg Lawson, and Damon Sharpe, while production was handled by Ric Wake, with additional production by Richie Jones. According to James Salmon from Yahoo! Music, the song is a "typically robust 'go girl' anthem."

Critical reception
Jose F. Promis writing for AllMusic called the song "the soulful, bombastic rocker". Sal Cinquemani from Slant Magazine wrote that "her tenacious attitude on songs like 'Paid My Dues' carve a unique niche for the singer." Aidin Vaziri wrote for Rolling Stone that the song is "grating" and one of Freak of Natures "moments of sheer overkill".

Music video
Directed by Liz Friedlander, the music video for "Paid My Dues" was shot in Los Angeles, California. In the beginning, Anastacia is speaking while being in a virtual mirror. Then you can see Anastacia in a room where she is packing her suitcases. Following this, you see her while she is trying to make her a way but there are many people she must across. Then she is in some kind of a disco, where she successfully tries again to find her way through people, this time to a stage.

When she finally arrives there, she goes through a mirror and is "teleported" to a stage, where she lip-synchs the song. In the end she pulls out the electricity cable.

Track listingsUK CD single "Paid My Dues" – 3:20
 "Paid My Dues" (The S-Man's Darkstar mix) – 5:25
 "I Dreamed You" – 5:08UK cassette single "Paid My Dues" – 3:20
 "Paid My Dues" (The S-Man's Darkstar radio edit) – 3:29
 "I Dreamed You" – 5:08European CD1 "Paid My Dues" – 3:20
 "Funk Medley" (live from Amsterdam) – 7:30European CD2 "Paid My Dues" – 3:20
 "Paid My Dues" (The S-Man's Darkstar mix) – 5:25
 "Paid My Dues" (The S-Man's Darkstar dub mix) – 5:23
 "Funk Medley" (live from Amsterdam) – 7:30Australian CD single "Paid My Dues"
 "Paid My Dues" (The S-Man's Darkstar radio edit)
 "Paid My Dues" (The S-Man's Darkstar mix)
 "I Dreamed You" (album version)
 "Funk Medley" (live from Amsterdam)

Credits and personnel
Credits are taken from the European CD1 liner notes.Studios Recorded at Cove City Sound Studios (Glen Cove, New York, US) and Sony Music Studios (New York City)
 Mixed at Cove City Sound Studios (Glen Cove, New York, US)Personnel'

 Anastacia – writing, vocals, backing vocals
 Greg Lawson, Damon Sharpe – writing
 LaMenga Kafi – writing, backing vocals
 Nicki Richards, Danny Madden – backing vocals
 Eric Kupper – keyboards, guitars
 Marc Russell – bass guitar, production coordination
 Ric Wake – production, arrangement

 Richie Jones – additional production, arrangement, mixing, drum programming
 Dan Hetzel – mixing, engineering
 Jim Annunziato – engineering assistant
 "Young" Dave Scheuer – recording
 Thomas R. Yezzi – recording (lead vocals)
 David Massey – A&R
 Lisa Braudé – executive producer, management

Charts

Weekly charts

Year-end charts

Certifications

Release history

References

2001 singles
2001 songs
Anastacia songs
Daylight Records singles
Epic Records singles
Music videos directed by Liz Friedlander
Number-one singles in Denmark
Number-one singles in Hungary
Number-one singles in Italy
Number-one singles in Norway
Number-one singles in Switzerland
Song recordings produced by Ric Wake
Songs written by Anastacia
Songs written by Damon Sharpe
Songs written by Greg Lawson